Regucalcin is a protein that in humans is encoded by the RGN gene

The protein encoded by this gene is a highly conserved, calcium-binding protein, that is preferentially expressed in the liver, kidney and other tissues. It may have an important role in calcium homeostasis. Studies in rats indicate that this protein may also play a role in aging, as it shows age-associated down-regulation. This gene is part of a gene cluster on chromosome Xp11.3-Xp11.23. Alternative splicing results in two transcript variants having different 5' UTRs, but encoding the same protein.

Regucalcin is a proposed name for a calcium-binding protein that was discovered in 1978    This protein is also known as Senescence Marker Protein-30 (SMP30). Regucalcin differs from calmodulin and other Ca2+-related proteins as it does not contain an EF-hand motif of Ca2+-binding domain.  It may regulate the effect of Ca2+ on liver cell functions. From many investigations, regucalcin has been shown to play a multifunctional role in many cell types as a regulatory protein in the intracellular signaling system.

Gene 

Regucalcin and its gene (rgn) are identified in 16 species consisting of regucalcin family. Regucalcin is greatly expressed in the liver of rats, although the protein is found in small amounts in other tissues and cells. The rat regucalcin gene consists of seven exons and six introns, and several consensus regulatory elements exist upstream of the 5’-flanking region.  The gene is localized on the proximal end of rat chromosome Xq11.1-12 and human Xp11.3-Xp11.23. AP-1, NFI-A1, RGPR-p117, and Wnt/β-catenin/TCF4 can bind to the promoter region of the rat regucalcin gene to mediate the Ca2+ and other signaling responses with various hormones and cytokines for transcriptional activation.

Function 

Regucalcin plays a pivotal role in the keep of intracellular Ca2+ homeostasis due to activating Ca2+ pump enzymes in the plasma membrane (basolateral membrane), microsomes (endoplasmic reticulum) and mitochondria of many cells. Regucalcin is localized in the cytoplasm, mitochondria, microsomes and nucleus. Regucalcin is translocated from cytoplasm to nucleus with hormone stimulation. Regucalcin has a suppressive effect on calcium signaling from the cytoplasm to the nucleus in the proliferative cells. Also, regucalcin has been demonstrated to transport into the nucleus of cells, and it can inhibit nuclear protein kinase, protein phosphatase, and deoxyribonucleic acid and ribonucleic acid synthesis. Regucalcin can control enhancement of cell proliferation due to hormonal stimulation. Moreover, regucalcin has been shown to have an inhibitory effect on aminoacyl t-RNA synthetase, a rate limiting enzyme at translational process of protein synthesis and an activatory effect on cystein protease and superoxide dismutase in liver and kidney cells.

Regucalcin is expressed in the neuron of brain tissues, and the decrease of brain regucalcin causes accumulation of calcium in the brain microsomes. Regucalcin has an inhibitory effect on protein kinase and protein phosphatase activity dependent on Ca signaling. Regucalcin has been shown to have an activatory effect on Ca pumping enzyme (Ca-ATPase) in heart sarcoplasmic reticulum. Regucalcin plays a role in the promotion of urinary calcium transport in the epithelial cells of kidney cortex. Overexpression of regucalcin suppresses cell death and apoptosis in the cloned rat hepatoma cells and normal rat kidney epithelial cells (NRK52E) induced by various signaling factors.

Thus, regucalcin plays a multifunctional role in the regulation of cell functions in liver, kidney cortex, heart and brain. Thus, regucalcin plays a pivotal role in keep of cell homeostasis and function. Regucalcin plays a pivotal role as a suppressor protein for cell signaling systems in many cell types.

Pathophysiologic role 

Overexpressing of regucalcin in rats (transgenic rats) has been shown to induce bone loss and hyperlipidemia with increasing age, indicating a pathophysiologic role. Regucalcin transgenic rat may be a useful tool as animal model in osteoporosis and hyperlipidemia. Also, regucalcin/SMP30-knockout mice are known to induce a suppression in ascorbic acid biosynthesis. The disorder of regucalcin expression has been proposed to be induced cancer, brain function, heart injury, kidney failure, osteoporosis, and hyperlipidemia. Regucalcin plays a novel role as a suppressor in carcinogenesis of human patients with various types of cancer including pancreatic cancer, breast cancer, hepatoma, and lung cancer. Of note, it has been conducted a systematic search to identify biomarker candidates for a frailty biomarker panel. Gene expression databases were to identify genes regulated in aging, longevity, and age-related diseases with a focus on secreted factors or molecules detectable in body fluids as potential frailty biomarkers. A total of 44 markers were evaluated in the seven categories listed above, and 19 were awarded a high priority score, 22 identified as medium priority and three were low priority. In each category high and medium priority markers were identified. Regucalcin (RGN) was proposed to be a core gene (protein) with high priority of frailty biomarkers in order to ascertain their diagnostic, prognostic and therapeutic potential.
Notably, it has been shown that epigenetic modifications of survivin and regucalcin in non-small cell lung cancer tissues contribute to malignancy.

References

Further reading 

 
 
 
 
 
 
 
 
 
 
 
 
 
 
 
 
 

Aging-related proteins
Calcium signaling
Proteins